Tom Hayward (born 30 September 1982) is a British Grand Prix motorcycle racer.

Career statistics

Grand Prix motorcycle racing

By season

Races by year

References

1982 births
Living people
British motorcycle racers
125cc World Championship riders